Prek Pnov is a district (khan) located in the outskirts of Phnom Penh, Cambodia. It is the largest district by land area.

Administration 
Preaek Pnov is subdivided into 5 sangkats and 59 phums.

References

Districts of Phnom Penh